Nicolina may refer to:

People
Nicolina Giordani (c.1740 – after 1775), an Italian opera singer
Nicolina Pernheim (born 1991), a Swedish Paralympic judoka
Nicolina Vaz de Assis (1874–1941), a Brazilian sculptor

Places
Nicolina (river), a tributary of the Bahlui in the city Iași, Romania
Nicolina, a neighbourhood in Iași, Romania
Nicolina railway station, in Iași, Romania

See also